Nick Henry DeMaggio (December 27, 1890 – January 23, 1981) was an American film editor.

Selected filmography (as editor)
 Hot Water (1937)
 Up the River (1938)
 News Is Made at Night (1939)
 The Lone Star Ranger (1942)
 The Mad Martindales (1942)
 ‘’Night and the City ‘’ (1950)
 Pickup on South Street (1953)

References

External links 

 

1890 births
1981 deaths
American film editors